Lee Eun-jung (born April 21, 1981) is a female long-distance runner from South Korea, who is best known for winning the half marathon at the 2005 Summer Universiade.

She won the 2007 edition of the JoongAng Seoul Marathon and has represented her country twice at Olympic level, running at the 2004 Athens Olympics and the 2008 Beijing Games.

Achievements

Personal bests
3000 metres - 9:43.12 min (2007)
5000 metres - 15:41.67 min (2005)
10,000 metres - 32:43.35 min (2005)
Half marathon - 1:11:15 hrs (2005)
Marathon - 2:26:17 hrs (2004)

References

1981 births
Living people
South Korean female long-distance runners
Athletes (track and field) at the 2004 Summer Olympics
Athletes (track and field) at the 2008 Summer Olympics
Olympic athletes of South Korea
Universiade medalists in athletics (track and field)
Universiade gold medalists for South Korea
Medalists at the 2005 Summer Universiade
21st-century South Korean women